Alessandro Sbaffo (born 27 August 1990) is an Italian footballer who plays as a midfielder for  club Recanatese.

Career
He made his Serie A debut for Chievo on 28 March 2010 in a game against Parma.

In summer 2010 Sbaffo left for Piacenza in temporary deal for €600,000 along with Cesare Rickler. Both players later banned due to involvement in 2011–12 Italian football scandal.

Sbaffo left for Ascoli Calcio 1898 in temporary deal in July 2011. He also received a call-up to Italy U21 B team in the first half of the season. On 1 June 2012 FIGC announced that the prosecutor request to ban Sbaffo for 3 years and 3 months. Then Sbaffo made a plea bargain in order to request the ban reduced to 16 months and €100,000 fine.

In 2013 Sbaffo played 2 games for Chievo in pre-season and left for Reggina on 5 August. Sbaffo played his first official game for Reggina in October 2013.

On 26 August 2014 he left for Latina in another temporary deal.

On 4 July 2019, he signed with Gubbio. On 31 January 2020 he moved to Arzignano.

On 8 September 2020 he joined Serie D club Recanatese.

References

External links
 
 
 

1990 births
Living people
Sportspeople from the Province of Ancona
Footballers from Marche
Italian footballers
Association football midfielders
Serie A players
Serie B players
Serie C players
Serie D players
A.C. ChievoVerona players
Piacenza Calcio 1919 players
Ascoli Calcio 1898 F.C. players
Reggina 1914 players
Latina Calcio 1932 players
U.S. Avellino 1912 players
Como 1907 players
A.C. Reggiana 1919 players
U.C. AlbinoLeffe players
A.S. Gubbio 1910 players
F.C. Arzignano Valchiampo players
U.S.D. Recanatese 1923 players